Emil Trinkler (19 May 1896, Bremen – 19 April 1931, Bremen) was a German geographer and explorer of Tibet and Afghanistan, the son of a tobacco trader.

Life and travels
Having fought in the World War I, Trinkler graduated in geography and natural science from the University of Munich in 1922. His exploratory journeys in Afghanistan, Kashmir and Tibet included close study of glaciers. Among several books he published on his return to Germany was Im Land der Stürme (In the Land of Storms, 1930). His archaeological collections can be found in the Überseemuseum Bremen.

Death and remembrance
Trinkler died as the result of an automobile accident near Bremen at the age of 35. A street in Bremen has been named for him.

Literary works
Tibet : Sein geographisches Bild und seine Stellung im Asiatischen Kontinen, (1922)
Through the heart of Afghanistan, (1928)., translation of Trinkler's Quer durch Afghanistan nach Indien (1927)
The Stormswept Roof of Asia, translation of Trinkler's Im Land der Stürme (1930)

Notes

External links

1896 births
1932 deaths
Scientists from Bremen
German explorers
Explorers of Asia
German orientalists
German geographers
German male non-fiction writers
20th-century geographers